= Ophiomancy =

Ophiomancy (from Ancient Greek ὄφις (óphis) 'snake' and μαντεία (manteía) 'divination') is a form of divination that interprets omens from the appearance or behavior of snakes.

== History ==
Belief in the prophetic significance of snakes possesses a long and geographically diverse history, emerging in various cultures across the globe.

Within Ancient Greece, snakes held strong associations with deities of healing, most notably Asclepius. Their appearances, particularly within dreams or during religious ceremonies, were sometimes interpreted as omens or divine messages.

In Zoroastrianism, snakes could be interpreted either as positive or negative omens.

The narrative of the serpent in the Garden of Eden holds a pivotal position within Abrahamic religions. According to Duane E. Smith, the narrative of the serpent in the Garden of Eden can be interpreted in the context of Mesopotamian ophiomancy.

The methodologies employed in interpreting omens from snakes likely exhibited variation depending on the cultural context and the specific circumstances of the observation. Interpretations could be derived from a range of factors, including the species of snake encountered, its specific behaviors (such as its manner of movement, patterns of coiling, instances of striking, or the shedding of skin), the location and time of the sighting, and any unusual physical characteristics it might possess.

== Bibliography ==
- Shaked, Shaul, ed. (2021). Officina Magica. Vol. 4. ISBN 978-90-47-40784-3.
